Philobota arabella is a moth of the family Oecophoridae. It is found in the dry grassy native woodlands of Victoria.

The wingspan is about 25 mm. Adults are on wing in September and October. Adults have orange forewings with a broad brown hairy margin.

The larvae are thought to feed in leaf litter.

External links
Australian Insects
Australian Faunal Directory

Oecophoridae
Moths described in 1856